Ain al-Tinah is a Syrian village in the Al-Qutayfah District of the Rif Dimashq Governorate. According to the Syria Central Bureau of Statistics (CBS), Ain al-Tinah had a population of 3,206 in the 2004 census. Its inhabitants are predominantly Sunni Muslims.

References

Bibliography

Populated places in Al-Qutayfah District